Arvind Sreenath (born 8 April 1984) is a former Indian cricketer who played for Karnataka and the Royal Challengers Bangalore. He made his Twenty20 International debut for India against South Africa on 2 October 2015.

International career
A left-arm quick bowler, Aravind was called up to India's One Day International squad for the series against England in October 2011 but did not play.

Aravind made his Twenty20 International debut for India against South Africa on 2 October 2015.

Aravind played for India internationally only once. After he made his debut for India against South Africa in October 2015, he never came back in international cricket or played international cricket.

Domestic career
In the 2011 Champions League Twenty20, Arvind played in six matches as his team, the Royal Challengers, made it to the final, losing to the Mumbai Indians.

Arvind overcame a career-threatening accident a couple of years ago and made his first-class debut in 2008. He is known for his ability to bowl both left arm fast and left arm spin.

Retirement
On 27 February 2018, after winning the Vijay Hazare trophy final, Aravind announced his retirement from all forms of cricket.

References

External links

1984 births
Living people
Indian cricketers
India Twenty20 International cricketers
Royal Challengers Bangalore cricketers
Karnataka cricketers
South Zone cricketers
Cricketers from Bangalore